Mr. Nice Guy is the seventh studio album by American saxophonist Ronnie Laws, released in 1983 by Capitol Records. The album reached No. 19 on the Billboard Traditional Jazz Albums chart and No. 24 on the Billboard Top Soul Albums chart.

Singles
"In the Groove" reached No. 31 on the Billboard'' Hot Black Singles chart.

Tracklisting

References

1983 albums
Ronnie Laws albums
Capitol Records albums